Vorselaar is a municipality located in the Belgian province of Antwerp. The municipality comprises only the town of Vorselaar proper. In 2021, Vorselaar had a total population of 7,995. The total area is 27.62 km2.

Famous inhabitants
 Cardinal Jozef-Ernest van Roey (b. Vorselaar, 13 January 1874-Mechelen, 6 August 1961) 
 Bart Wellens, Cyclo-cross champion.

References

External links

Official website - Available only in Dutch

Municipalities of Antwerp Province
Populated places in Antwerp Province